The 1943 Georgia Pre-Flight Skycrackers football team represented the United States Navy pre-flight aviation training school at the University of Georgia during the 1943 college football season. The team compiled a 7–1–1 record and outscored opponents by a total of 183 to 105.

In July 1943, Lieutenant Rex Enright was assigned as the team's head coach. His assistant coaches included Andy Pilney, Bud Kerr, and George T. Barclay.

Players included Pat Harder (Wisconsin), Steve Filipowicz (Fordham), Fuller Brooks, Warren Tiller, Carl Nolte, Zealand Thigpen, Tom Averitt, Wally Moesmer, Jim Randall, Carl Dreisbach, H. C. Byars, Jim Shepard, and Oscar Hoequist. Harder was named as a second-team player on the 1943 All-Service football team.

Schedule

References

Georgia Pre-Flight
Georgia Pre-Flight Skycrackers football seasons
Georgia Pre-Flight Skycrackers football